The San Diego State Aztecs women's water polo team is a varsity intercollegiate water polo team of San Diego State University. The team competes in the Golden Coast Conference (GCC) in Division I of the National Collegiate Athletic Association (NCAA). The team became a varsity program in 1995, competing without a conference for its first season before joining the Mountain Pacific Sports Federation (MPSF) for the following season. The Aztecs are a founding member of the GCC, which had its first season in 2014.

All-time season results

See also 

 Aztec Hall of Fame

References

External links 

 

women's
Golden Coast Conference women's water polo
College women's water polo teams in the United States